The Patagones or Patagonian giants were a race of giant humans rumoured to be living in Patagonia and described in early European accounts. Tales of these people would maintain a hold upon European conceptions of the region for nearly 300 years.

History 
The first mention of these people came from the voyage of Ferdinand Magellan and his crew, who claimed to have seen them while exploring the coastline of South America en route to the Maluku Islands in their circumnavigation of the world in the 1520s. Antonio Pigafetta, one of the expedition's few survivors and the chronicler of Magellan's expedition, wrote in his account about their encounter with natives twice a normal person's height:

Pigafetta also recorded that Magellan had bestowed on these people the name "Patagão" (i.e. "Patagon", or Patagoni in Pigafetta's Italian plural), but he did not further elaborate on his reasons for doing so. The original word would probably be in Ferdinand Magellan's native Portuguese (patagão) or the Spanish of his men (patagón). Since Pigafetta's time the assumption that this derived from pata or foot took hold, and "Patagonia" was interpreted to mean "Land of the Bigfeet". However, this etymology remains questionable, since amongst other things the meaning of the suffix -gon is unclear. It is now understood that the etymology refers to a literary character in a Spanish novel of the early 16th century.  Nevertheless, the name "Patagonia" stuck, as did the notion that the local inhabitants were giants. Early maps of the New World afterwards would sometimes attach the label regio gigantum ("region of giants") to the area.

In 1579, Francis Drake's ship chaplain, Francis Fletcher, wrote about meeting very tall Patagonians, of "7 foote and a halfe".

Also in the 1590s, William Adams, an Englishman aboard a Netherlander ship rounding Tierra del Fuego, reported a violent encounter between his ship's crew and unnaturally tall natives.

The Dutch sailors Sebald de Weert in 1598, Olivier van Noort in 1599, and Joris van Spilbergen in 1615 claimed that giants were living in Patagonia. 

In 1766, a rumour leaked out upon their return to Great Britain that the crew of HMS Dolphin, captained by Commodore John Byron, had seen a tribe of  natives in Patagonia when they passed by there on their circumnavigation of the globe. However, when a newly edited revised account of the voyage came out in 1773, the Patagonians were recorded as being —very tall, especially by 18th century standards, but by no means giants.

Explanations 
In 1615, a grave with bones of the giants in Puerto Deseado was reported by Willem Schouten and Jacob Le Maire. This claim was possibly initiated by fossil finds.

The people encountered by Byron were in all likelihood the Tehuelches, indigenous to the region. Later writers consider the Patagonian giants to have been a hoax, or at least an exaggeration and misreporting of earlier European accounts of the region.

These accounts may also refer to the Selk'nam people. A photo of a seven-foot tall Selk'nam ("Ona") man can be found in the Library of Congress.

See also 
Hyperborea

References 

 
 

Giants
Indigenous peoples in Argentina
Indigenous peoples in Chile
Patagonia
Chilean mythology
Mythological peoples
Spanish-language South American legendary creatures